Halimat Oyinoza Ismaila (born 3 July 1984 in Ilorin, Kwara) is a Nigerian track and field athlete who won a bronze medal in 4x100 metres relay at the 2008 Summer Olympics.

Ismaila represented Nigeria at the 2008 Summer Olympics in Beijing competing at the 100 metres sprint. In her first round heat she placed fourth in a time of 11.72 which was not enough to advance to the second round. Together with Ene Franca Idoko, Gloria Kemasuode, Agnes Osazuwa and Oludamola Osayomi she also took part in the 4x100 metres relay. In their first round heat (without Ismaila) they placed fourth behind Belgium, Great Britain and Brazil. Their time of 43.43 seconds was the best non-directly qualifying time and the sixth time overall out of sixteen participating nations. With this result they qualified for the final in which they replaced Osazuwa with Ismaila. They sprinted to a time of 43.04 seconds, a third place and a bronze medal after Russia and Belgium. In 2016, the Russian team was disqualified and stripped of their gold medal due to doping violations by one of the Russian runners, Yuliya Chermoshanskaya, thereby promoting Nigeria to the silver medal position.

Achievements

References

External links

1984 births
Living people
Nigerian female sprinters
Olympic athletes of Nigeria
Athletes (track and field) at the 2004 Summer Olympics
Athletes (track and field) at the 2008 Summer Olympics
Olympic silver medalists for Nigeria
Medalists at the 2008 Summer Olympics
Yoruba sportswomen
Olympic silver medalists in athletics (track and field)
Olympic female sprinters
People from Ilorin
20th-century Nigerian women
21st-century Nigerian women